Karanayaul (Qaranay-avul) is a rural locality (a selo) in Kayakentsky District, Republic of Dagestan, Russia. The population was 1,695 as of 2010. There are 11 streets.

Geography 
Karanayaul is located 27 km northwest of Novokayakent (the district's administrative centre) by road. Sagasi-Deybuk and Pervomayskoye are the nearest rural localities.

Nationalities 
Kumyks and Dargins live there.

References 

Rural localities in Kayakentsky District